Opercularia apiciflora is a plant in the Rubiaceae family. It was first described in 1804 by Jacques Labillardière. There are no synonyms.

It is found in south-west Western Australia.

References

External links
Opercularia apiciflora images & occurrence data from Atlas of Living Australia
Kew Herbarium: K000772237 & K000772238 (image of specimen collected by JJH Labillardiere)

Taxa named by Jacques Labillardière
Plants described in 1804
Flora of Western Australia
apiciflora